The 27th European Film Awards were presented on 13 December 2014 in Riga, Latvia. The winners were selected by more than 2,500 members of the European Film Academy. Nominations for the People's Choice Award category were announced on 1 September 2014. On 16 September 2014, the European Film Academy and EFA Productions announced a list of 50 films which qualified for nominations. All nominations were announced on 8 November 2014 at the Seville European Film Festival in Spain. British director Steve McQueen was presented with the European Achievement in World Cinema Award and filmmaker Agnès Varda was honoured with the Lifetime Achievement Award.

Winners and nominees

Best Film

Best Director

Best Screenwriter

Best European Actor

Best European Actress

Best Comedy

People's Choice Award for Best European Film

Discovery of the Year

Best Animated Feature Film
The nominees were announced on 22 September 2014.

Best Documentary

Best Cinematographer

Best Editor

Best Production Designer

Best Costume Designer

Best Composer

Best Sound Designer

European Co-Production Award—Prix Eurimages

European Achievement in World Cinema

Lifetime Achievement Award

Best Short Film
The nominees for Best Short Film were selected by independent juries at a series of film festivals throughout Europe.

Young Audience Award
Twelve- to fourteen-year-old audiences from across Europe voted for the winner after watching the three nominated films at special screenings held on "Young Audience Film Day".

References

External links 
 

2014 film awards
European Film Awards ceremonies
Culture in Riga
2014 in Latvia
2014 in Europe